White Dominicans are Dominican people of predominant or full European descent. They are 17.8% of the Dominican Republic's population, according to a 2021 survey by the United Nations Population Fund. The majority of white Dominicans have ancestry from the first European settlers to arrive in Hispaniola in 1492 and are descendants of the Spanish and  Portuguese who settled in the island during colonial times, as well as the French who settled in the 17th and 18th centuries.
Many whites in the Dominican Republic also descend from Italians, Dutchmen, Germans, Hungarians, Scandinavians, Americans and other nationalities who have migrated between the 19th and 20th centuries. About 9.2% of the Dominican population claims a European immigrant background, according to the 2021 Fondo de Población de las Naciones Unidas survey.

White Dominicans historically made up a larger percentage in the Captaincy General of Santo Domingo and for a time were the single largest ethnic group prior to the 19th century. Similar to the rest of the Hispanic Caribbean, the majority of Spaniards who settled the Dominican Republic came from southern Spain, Andalusia and the Canary Islands, the latter of whom are of partial North African Guanche descent.

Population

The 1750 estimates show that there were 30,863 whites out of a total population of 70,625 in the colony of Santo Domingo. 
The 1920 Santo Domingo Census was the first national enumeration. This revealed a total of 223,144	(24.9%) identified as white.
The second census, taken in 1935, covered race, religion, literacy, nationality, labor force and urban-rural residence. Table shows the results per census to 1960. 

The census bureau decided to discontinue its use of racial classifications in the 1970 census. The Dominican identity card (issued by the Junta Central Electoral) used to categorised people as yellow, white, Indian, and black, in 2011 the Junta planned to replace Indian with mulatto in a new ID card with biometric data that was under development, but in 2014 when it released the new ID card, it decided to just drop racial categorisation, the old ID card expired on 10 January 2015. The Ministry of Public Works and Communications uses racial classification in the driver's license, being white, mestizo, mulatto, black, and yellow the categories used.

The 2022 Dominican Republic Census will reintroduce ethno-racial classifications.

History

Conquest and settlement 

The presence of whites in the Dominican Republic dates back to the founding of La Isabela, one of the first European settlements in the Americas, by Bartholomew Columbus in 1493. The presence of precious metals such as gold boosted migration of thousands of Spaniards to Hispaniola seeking easy wealth. They tried to enslave the Taíno, but many of these died of diseases, and those who survived did not make good slaves.

In 1510, there were 10,000 Spaniards in the colony of Santo Domingo, and it rose to over 20,000 in 1520. But following the depleting of the gold mines, the island began to depopulate, as most poor Spanish colonists embarked to the newly conquered Mexico or to Venezuela (which was aggravated by the conquest of Peru in 1533). This was followed by a limited Spanish migration toward Hispaniola, composed overwhelmingly by males. In order to counteract the depopulation and impoverishment of the colony, the Spanish Monarchy allowed the importation of African slaves to hew sugar cane.

By 1542 there were only few hundred natives. Several epidemics wiped out the remaining natives on the island.

The shortage of Spanish females led to miscegenation, that drove the creation of a caste system, (casta), in which Spaniards were at the top, mixed-race people at middle, and Amerindians and black people at the bottom. Endogamy became a norm within the higher classes, in order to maintain their status and remain racially pure especially, specially because only pure whites were able to inherit majorats. As a result, Santo Domingo, like the rest of Hispanic America, became a pigmentocracy. The local-born whites were known as blancos de la tierra ("whites from the land"), in contrast to the blancos de Castilla, "whites from Castile".

The color prejudice between blacks and whites practically disappeared due to the great misery that prevailed in the colony.

By the mid-17th century, the overall population decreased to 3,000 inhabitants and it was concentrated in or near the city of Santo Domingo. About one tenth of the colony's population was Portuguese-born; they were concentrated in the Cibao valley, where they had an influence on the Spanish dialect spoken in that area; another 3% was born in Spain or descended exclusively from Spaniards.

18th century
During the eighteenth century, there were French colonists that settled in many Spanish towns, particularly in Santiago, by 1730 they totalled 25% of the population. This was seen as a problem for the Spanish authorities, because if the population became mostly French, there could be problems of loyalty toward Spain.

In 1718 a Royal Decree ordered the expel of the French people from Santo Domingo. The Grand Mayor of Santiago, Antonio Pichardo Vinuesta, refused to obey the decree arguing that most of the Frenchmen had married local women and that their expulsion would damage the economy of the Cibao. Grand Mayor Pichardo was tried and imprisoned in the city of Santo Domingo, but in the next year, the Council of the Indies reasoned in favor of Pichardo and decided a pardon to the French. In 1720-1721, a revolt in Santiago against a new tax on beef exports to the Saint Domingue, arose Frenchification fears in the Santo Domingo elite; Captain-General , governor of the Santo Domingo, accused the Cibaenian elite of seeking to annex their province to France.

After the failed plans of the Spanish Monarchy to expel the French colonists, the Monarchy decided to actively encourage the mass settlement of Spanish families in order to counteract the Frenchification of the colony. Over the next decades, the Spanish colony of Santo Domingo was the subject of a mass migration of Spaniards, most of whom came from the Canary Islands.

During that period, Neyba (1733), San Juan de la Maguana (1733), Puerto Plata (1736), Dajabón (1743), Montecristi (1751), Santa Bárbara de Xamaná (1756), San Rafael de la Angostura (1761), Sabana de la Mar (1761), Las Caobas (1763), Baní (1764), Las Matas de Farfán (1767), San Miguel de la Atalaya (1768), Moca (1773), Juana Núñez (1775), San José de los Llanos (1779), San Pedro de Macorís (1779), and San Carlos de Tenerife (1785), were founded. Due to this migration, it decreased the amount of coloreds and blacks: the black population dropped to 12%, the mulatto population to 8%, and the quadroons to 31%.

After that peak, the local white population began to migrate (especially towards Puerto Rico, Curaçao and Venezuela), first with the Haitian rule, and later with the constant political and economic instability after Dominican independence. Historically, migration to Puerto Rico was constant (except between 1898 and the 1930s, when there was a wave of Puerto Rican migrants to the Dominican Republic) and it boosted in the 20th century because of the oppressive regimes of Trujillo and Balaguer. Although, the country has received a tiny but steady immigration (from other countries than Haiti), which has partly offset the constant emigration.

Dominican War of Independence 
The Haitian Occupation of Santo Domingo lasted from 1822 until 1844, and sometime during this span, a totalitarian military government took place that forbade the Dominican people by law from taking public office, were on permanent curfew since early dusk and had the public university closed down on the pretext that it was a subversive institution.

In 1838 Dominican nationalists Juan Pablo Duarte, Francisco del Rosario Sánchez, Matías Ramón Mella established the Trinitario movement.In 1844, the members chose El Conde, the prominent “Gate of the Count” in the old city walls, as a rallying point for their insurrection against the Haitian government. On the morning of 27 February 1844, El Conde rang with the shots of the plotters, who had emerged from their secret meetings to openly challenge the Haitians. Their efforts were successful, and for the next ten years, Dominican military strongmen fought to preserve their country's independence against the Haitian government. 

Under the command of Faustin Soulouque Haitian soldiers tried to gain back control of lost territory, but this effort was to no avail as the Dominicans would go on to decisively win every battle henceforth. In March 1844, a 30,000-strong two-pronged attack by Haitians was successfully repelled by an under-equipped Dominican army under the command of the wealthy rancher Gen. Pedro Santana. Four years later, it took a Dominican flotilla harassing Haitian coastal villages, and land reinforcements in the south to force Haitian emperor into a one-year truce. In the most thorough and intense encounter of all, Dominicans armed with swords sent Haitian troops into flight on all three fronts in 1855 solidifying the Dominican nation's independence.

Emigration 

Due to political instability during the España Boba period, some of the whites in Santo Domingo fled the country between 1795 and 1820, mainly to Venezuela, Puerto Rico, and Cuba. However, many white families stayed on the island. Many whites in Santo Domingo did not consider owning slaves due to the economic crisis in Santo Domingo. But the few rich white elites that did, fled the colony. Many of these white families that stayed on the island settled in the cibao region owning land. Some Dominican historians and intellectuals, such as Américo Lugo, Joaquín Balaguer and Antonio del Monte y Tejada, deplored that "Santo Domingo lost most of its best families" at that era, specially during the Haitian domination. After independence and being under Spanish control again in 1863, many families returned to the island including new waves of immigration from Spain occurred.

Post-independence immigration 
The majority of the immigrants that settled in the Dominican Republic in the 19th century and the first half of the 20th century established their residence in Santo Domingo, Santiago, Moca and Puerto Plata.

During the 19th century Puerto Plata was the most important port in the country (and even became provisional capital) and hosted the European and North American migration to the Dominican Republic. The majority were Germans traders and tobacco producers, most of them being from Hamburg and Bremen. There were also Englishmen, Dutch, Spaniards (mainly from Catalonia), Puerto Ricans (at least 30,000 between 1880 and 1940), Cubans (at least 5,000 immigrated during the Ten Years' War) and Italians. After the Restoration War there was an inflow of Americans and French. Most immigrants during this period completely assimilated into the local Dominican population. The most prominent migrants' surnames that went to this city were Arzeno, Balaguer, Batlle, Bonarelli, Brugal, Capriles, Demorizi, Ferrari, Imbert, Lithgow, Lockward, McKinney, Paiewonsky, Prud'homme, Puig, Rainiere, Villanueva, Vinelli and Zeller.
In 1871, half of Puerto Plata's population was composed of foreigners; and in both the 1888 and 1897 censuses, 30% was foreign born.

Most of the offspring of Puerto Plata's immigrants moved to Santiago and Santo Domingo in the 20th century.

Geographic distribution

The distribution of white Dominicans or European descended population is the Cibao or Northern region, particularly the Sierra where according to the 1950 census, six out of ten people identified as white.

The Southeastern and Southwestern regions have fairly smaller concentrations of whites in comparison to the North with the exception of the city of Santo Domingo.
The Sierra was peopled in the 18th century mostly by ethnic Canarians and French who established a markedly endogamous society where they didn't miscegenate with mulattos or blacks in order to preserve their whiteness; African slaves were negligible except in San José de las Matas, where today there is a large admixed population. The Sierra received a sizeable amount of white and mulatto refugees from both Saint-Domingue (Haiti), and the Cibao Valley, the former during the Haitian Revolution and the latter amid the Dominican genocide by the Haitian army in 1805.

Present Day
In the modern era, there are sizeable numbers of immigrants settling in the Dominican Republic from North America and Europe, especially countries like Spain, Italy, France, United States, and Canada, among others. Around the region of Latin America, many whites and European-dominate multiracials are immigrating to the country from places like Venezuela, Puerto Rico, and Cuba, among others. The Puerto Rican population in the Dominican Republic has been steadily climbing recently, and the country now has a large and fast growing Venezuelan population, of which whom make up the second largest immigrant group in Dominican Republic after Haitians. White immigrants from North America and Europe tend to be significantly wealthier in comparison to the more middle and working class whites coming to the country from other parts of Latin America, the former preferring tourist areas like Punta Cana and Sosua, while the latter choosing big cities like Santo Domingo and Santiago de los Caballeros. A large portion of Dominican emigrants and descendants, of all races including White Dominicans, who settled other countries like the United States and Spain, engage in Circular migration, in which they would live the early years working in the United States to retire the later years in Dominican Republic, or frequent relocation between homes in the United States and Dominican Republic, oftentimes a home of a family member.

In Dominican Republic and some other Latin American countries, it can sometimes be difficult to determine the exact number of racial groups, because the lines between whites and lighter multiracials are very blurry, which is also true between blacks and darker multiracials. As race in Dominican Republic acts as continuum of white—mulatto—black and not as clear cut as in places like the United States. And many times in the same family, there can be people of different colors and racial phenotypes who are blood related, this is due to the large amounts of interracial mixing for hundreds of years in Dominican Republic and the Spanish Caribbean in general, allowing for high amounts of genetic diversity.

 Whiteness and social status 
The Dominican Republic is similar to other countries in Latin America that were colonized by Europeans, and shows a clear correlation between race and wealth. The upper and upper-middle classes of the Dominican Republic are overwhelmingly of European origin.

The middle class, which is the class with the broadest colour spectrum, is roughly ⅓ white. Altogether, about 45% of the lower-middle, upper-middle and upper class Dominicans are white, with mixed-race Dominicans reaching a similar proportion.

The lower class is overwhelmingly of mixed-race background.

Establishment of a European eliteLimpieza de sangre (meaning literally "cleanliness of blood") was very important in Mediæval Spain, and this system was replicated on the New World. The highest social class was the Visigothic nobility of Central European origin, commonly known as people of "sangre azul" (Spanish for: "blue blood"), because their skin was so pale that their veins looked blue through it, in comparison with that of a commoner who had olive skin. Those who proved that they were descendants of Visigoths were allowed to use the style of Don and were considered hidalgos. Hidalgos nobles were the most benefited of those Spanish who emigrated to America because they received royal properties (such as cattle, lands, and slaves) and tax exemptions.
These people achieved a privileged position, and most of them avoided mixing with natives or Africans. This led to certain family names to be related both to whiteness, as with a better social-economic position; these family names were Angulo, Aybar, Bardecí, Bastidas, Benavides, Caballero, Cabral, Camarena, Campusano, Caro, Coca, Coronado, Dávila, De Castro, De la Concha, De la Rocha, Del Monte, Fernández de Castro, Fernández de Fuenmayor, Fernández de Oviedo, Frómesta, Garay, Guzmán, Heredia, Herrera, Jiménez (and its variant Jimenes), Jover, Landeche, Lora, Leoz y Echálaz, Maldonado, Mieses, Monasterios, Mosquera, Nieto, Ovalle, Palomares, Paredes, Pérez, Pichardo, Pimentel, Quesada, Serrano, Solano, Vega, and Villoria.

The Spanish of the highest rank who migrated to America in the sixteenth century was the noblewoman Doña María Álvarez de Toledo y Rojas, granddaughter of the 1st Duke of Alba, niece of the 2nd Duke of Alba, and grandniece of King Ferdinand of Aragon; she was married to Diego Columbus, Admiral and Viceroy of the Indies.

Many Criollo families migrated to other Spanish colonies.

Further immigration from the 17th and 18th centuries made subsequently that newly rich families emerged among them, which are: Alfau, De Marchena, Mirabal, Tavárez (and its variants Tavares and Taveras), Lopez-Penha, Marten-Ellis and Troncoso.And others from the 19th and 20th centuries: Armenteros, Arzeno, Báez, Barceló, Beras, Bermúdez, Bonetti, Brugal, Corripio, Esteva, Goico, Haché, Hoffiz, Lama, León, Morel, Munné, Ottenwalder, Pellerano,  Paiewonski, Piantini, Rochet, Rizek, Vicini, Vila, and Vitienes.''

See also
 Criollo people
 White Latin Americans
 White Hispanic and Latino Americans
 Dominican people
 Afro-Dominicans
 Spanish diaspora
 History of the Jews in the Dominican Republic
 Mixed Dominicans
 Racism in the Dominican Republic

Notes

References

Ethnic groups in the Dominican Republic
European Caribbean
 
White Caribbean
White Latin American
White Dominicans